Norm Mitchell (born 30 June 1949) is a former Australian rules footballer who played with Footscray in the Victorian Football League (VFL).

Notes

External links 		
		
		

	
		
Living people		
1949 births		
Australian rules footballers from Victoria (Australia)		
Western Bulldogs players